The Asian American Journal of Psychology is a peer-reviewed academic journal published by the American Psychological Association on behalf of the Asian American Psychological Association. The journal "is dedicated to research, practice, advocacy, education, and policy within Asian American psychology." The editor-in-chief is Bryan S. K. Kim (University of Hawaii at Hilo).

Abstracting and Indexing 
According to the Journal Citation Reports, the journal has a 2020 impact factor of 1.547.

Publication guidelines
We encourage articles that:

·Contribute towards knowledge of Asian American psychology through research and examination of methodology.
·Develop and advance theories pertinent to Asian Americans.
·Promote the education and training of psychologists to work with Asian Americans, including the special issues relevant to the delivery of services to minority populations.
·Attend to issues of social justice and policy issues related to Asian American individuals and communities.
·Include attention to diverse communities within the broadest meaning of what it means to be Asian American.
·Utilize qualitative and mixed method approaches.

References

External links 
 

American Psychological Association academic journals
English-language journals
Psychology journals